Get Another Boyfriend is a song by American pop boy band Backstreet Boys. The song was featured in Lizzie McGuire.

Critical reception 
EW described it as "essentially Backstreet’s version of “It’s Gonna Be Me”", and felt that along with The Call the song was an example of the group presenting themselves as "bad boys on the prowl". Rolling Stones wrote the song had " drama-crazed harmonies". Allmusic felt the song's similarity to "It's Gonna Be Me" and "Baby One More Time" was the result of all three being written by Max Martin. Mashable described it as "attitude-filled". New York Post thought the song had a "distinct quality of musical maturity" that the magazine likened to Michael Jackson's Thriller.

References 

Backstreet Boys songs